Rodat is an Indonesian and Malay folk dance believed to have originated from the Middle East and was spread to the Indonesian archipelago by the Acehnese traders in the beginning of 19th century. Rodat may have been the combination of two words hadrat Baghdad which means zikir (songs in praise of Allah and Muhammad) Baghdad.

Until the 1900s, Rodat was performed in all males groups with the original style of singing zikir with rebana accompaniment to celebrate Muhammad’s birthday and Malay weddings. However, by 1930, the dancing part was included and performed by transvestite dancers which were later replaced by the women dancers after World War II. With the addition of dancing and singing of popular Malay and Hindustani tunes and female dancers, the performance became popular at secular events such as the harvest celebration, Sultan’s birthday and festivities for Malaysian National Day.

A Rodat performance involves singing of 8 to 12 verses from the Kitab Zikir (book of Zikir) which is filled with advice, customs, fun, contemplation and awareness, in responsorial style between the male and female groups of chorus members, and is accompanied by the rhythmic patterns of the Rebana drum. The number of performers ranges from 20 to 26 and consisted of three separate group of performers: pelenggok (12 male dancers), pengadi (eight drummers) and mak inang (four to six female dancers). The basic dance movements are divided into sitting-kneeling, a combination of squatting and standing (performed mainly by male dancers) and standing movements.

See also

 Saman (dance)
 Islam in Indonesia
 Islam Nusantara

References

Indonesian culture
Dances of Indonesia
Malay culture
Malay dances